Pakistan Media Development Authority (PMDA) is newly controversial governing body which aims to regulate all forms of media including print, television, radio, films, advertisements, and digital media in the country this governing body will replace 20 years old Pakistan Electronic Media Regulatory Authority.

Constitutional Status & (PMDA) Ordinance 2021
PTI government of Pakistan brought ordinance in National Assembly of Pakistan to set up new governing body which will regulate the electronic, print media as well as social media. The government wanted to get rid of the seven laws which are currently regulating the press, including the 20-year-old Pakistan Electronic Media Regulatory Authority (PEMRA), a major body governing media in Pakistan. The ordinance proposes to repeal all current media-related laws, including the Press Council Ordinance, 2002, the Press, Newspapers, News Agencies and Books Registration Ordinance, 2002, the Newspaper Employees, (Conditions of Service Act), 1973, the Pakistan Electronic Media Regulatory Authority Ordinance, 2002, as amended by the Pemra Amendment Act, 2007, and the Motion Pictures Ordinance, 1979. Government solo proposes to merge all these law into single ordinance but opposition parties and Pakistani journalist totally against it, but government owe not take back the ordinance from National Assembly.

Digital media
It's under way that government will allow the Authority to register digital media platforms, check, analysis & watchout then to ensure cyber laws enforcement, then in near future is PMDA will set up then license will be obtained from PMDA to for Digital media platform. PMDA not only overlooks but also sanction on digital media platforms if they don't follow the laws. Further it will also set up cell to forensic cyber audit as well.

Broadcast print and films
The PMDA will also be responsible for regulating broadcast and print media. It will issue no-objection certificates (NOCs) for film production and exhibition, issue licences for and monitor broadcast media.

Wages
Similarly the regulatory function will determine media employees’ wages and resolve wage disputes too.

Criticism

Current Status

References

Communications authorities
Regulatory authorities of Pakistan
Broadcasting in Pakistan
Censorship in Pakistan